Ida Odén (born 14 April 1987) is a Swedish female handballer for IK Sävehof and the Swedish national team.

Achievements
Swedish Championship:
Winner: 2006, 2007, 2009, 2010, 2011, 2012, 2013, 2014, 2015 and 2018
Silver Medalist: 2008
Carpathian Trophy: 
Winner: 2015

References

1987 births
Living people
People from Borås
Swedish female handball players
IK Sävehof players
Sportspeople from Västra Götaland County